Festival Pier is a stop for river boat services on the River Thames, London, UK. It is immediately in front of the Royal Festival Hall and National Film Theatre, and serves the South Bank complex. The pier is owned and operated by London River Services, part of Transport for London.

Services
The pier is used for summer leisure cruises between Westminster and Tower Bridge Quay operated by Crown River Cruises.

A High Speed RIB service also runs from this pier between March and November operated by Rib Tours London.

Accident
On 21 May 1991, the central section of Festival Pier collapsed. There were no injuries, but the pier was closed for several months for repair.

Local attractions
London Eye
London Aquarium
Dali Universe
Florence Nightingale Museum
Big Ben
South Bank arts precinct
Crown River Cruises
Rib Tours London

Lines

References

London River Services
Piers in London